Caldwell-Cobb-Love House is a historic home located at Lincolnton, Lincoln County, North Carolina.  It was built about 1841 as a transitional Federal / Greek Revival dwelling and extensively remodeled in the Victorian Cottage style about 1877.  It was again remodeled and enlarged at the turn of the 20th century.  The two-story, frame dwelling features three cross gable ells, wall dormers, inset porch, and balconies.  It has a three-story rear wing.  It was built by Dr. Elam Caldwell, a grandson of William Sharpe (1742–1818), a member of the Continental Congress.

It was listed on the National Register of Historic Places in 1986.

References

Houses on the National Register of Historic Places in North Carolina
Federal architecture in North Carolina
Greek Revival houses in North Carolina
Victorian architecture in North Carolina
Houses completed in 1841
Houses in Lincoln County, North Carolina
National Register of Historic Places in Lincoln County, North Carolina